Little Bowman Pond is a small glacial lake in the Taborton section of the Town of Sand Lake, Rensselaer County, New York, United States.  The lake is located on a geologic formation known as the Rensselaer Plateau.

References 

Lakes of Rensselaer County, New York
Lakes of New York (state)